Eric Engo (born 1 August 1970) is a Gabonese footballer. He played in four matches for the Gabon national football team from 1998 to 2000. He was also named in Gabon's squad for the 2000 African Cup of Nations tournament.

References

External links
 

1970 births
Living people
Gabonese footballers
Gabon international footballers
2000 African Cup of Nations players
Place of birth missing (living people)
Association football defenders
21st-century Gabonese people
ES Zarzis players
Gabonese expatriate footballers
Expatriate footballers in Tunisia